DYBU-DTV (digital UHF channel 43) is a Philippine television station owned by Radyo Natin Network and operated by its affiliate Manila Broadcasting Company in the Philippines. The station's transmitter is located at Eggling Subdivision, Busay Hills, Cebu City.

Digital television

Digital channels

UHF Channel 43 (647.143 MHz)

See also
List of Manila Broadcasting Company stations

References

External links

Digital television stations in the Philippines
Television stations in Cebu City
Television channels and stations established in 1999
Manila Broadcasting Company
1999 establishments in the Philippines